Elections to the unicameral legislative body of the Canadian province of British Columbia, the Legislative Assembly of British Columbia, are held every four years. Fixed election dates for the Legislative Assembly of British Columbia, occurring every four years, were instituted in 2002, after the Constitution (Fixed Election Dates) Amendment Act (SBC 2001 c.36) was passed in 2001. The regular election date for the Legislative Assembly is set to occur on the third Saturday in October in the fourth calendar year after the previous election, with the next election scheduled for October 19, 2024.

The number of seats has increased over time, from 25 for the first election in 1871, to the current 87.

Every election from 1871 to 1986 elected a portion of its MLAs from multi-member constituencies, usually two-member constituencies. Voters in these districts had as many votes as there were seats (block-voting), and generally the party with the most supporters in the district filled all the seats, with no representation left for the others. This generally helped ensure the sitting government's capture of the most seats. (It also makes the "popular vote", the votes cast, not truly reflective of the sentiment of the voters, due to some voters casting two (or more votes) and others only one.)

Until the 1903 election, British Columbia politics were officially non-partisan – political parties were not part of the official process. One of the first parties to be noticed in BC politics, the Nationalist Party espoused "National Socialism", based on Edward Bellamy's writings, and favoured nationalization of industry. Its candidate Robert Macpherson was elected MLA in 1894 and 1898.

The general non-partisanship changed in the 1898 and 1900 elections with the official listing of party candidates, and federal political parties were recognized in the provincial election of 1903. The first elections held along party lines (1903–41) were primarily contested by the Conservative Party (which won five elections during this period) and the Liberal Party (which won six elections).

For three terms during and immediately after World War II, the legislature was managed by a coalition government between the Conservatives and the Liberals. The Social Credit Party dominated elections from 1952 to 1986, winning eleven of the twelve elections (the single exception a NDP victory). Provincial politics since 1986 have been dominated by the New Democratic Party (NDP) which won both elections held in the 1990s, and by the Liberal Party, which won the 2001 election and the next three elections.

Since 2017, the government has been formed by the NDP. From 2017 to 2020, the NDP formed a minority government with a confidence and supply agreement with the Green Party. Following the 2020 election, the NDP formed a majority government.

Absentee voting
Contemporary elections in British Columbia use a relatively unique system of handling absentee ballots. While all jurisdictions in Canada allow for absentee voting through advance communication with the appropriate federal or provincial election agency, British Columbia is unique in allowing same-day absentee voting at any polling station in the province; ballots so cast are not counted locally on election night, however, but are sent to the voter's home riding and counted two weeks after election day. One important effect of this is that a particularly close race, such as the nine-vote margin that initially separated the main candidates in Courtenay-Comox in the 2017 election, may not have a winner officially declared until the absentee ballots have been counted at the later date; as well, because the absentee vote tends to favour the New Democratic Party rather than the Liberal Party, a district narrowly won by the Liberals has a higher chance of being flipped by absentee voters than a narrow NDP win does.

The system exists both to serve commuters in the Greater Vancouver Area, where requiring people to vote at home frequently forced suburban districts to cope with sudden crowds of late voters at the end of the day, pushing past poll closing time and delaying the counting of the results in those areas, and because the province has a much higher than normal proportion of people who work away from home for long periods in remote natural resources sites.

Summary of results

Before 1903

Prior the 1903 election, political parties in British Columbia were not officially recognized in provincial elections. During this period, some candidates declared their support for the administration as "Government" candidates, while those not in support ran as "Non-Government" or Independent candidates. However, these pre-election alignments often did not persist once the House was seated as allegiances would frequently shift.

While there were no official party lines, there were unofficial yet unstable ones. Premiers Amor De Cosmos and Joseph Martin both sat, at various times, in the federal House of Commons as Liberals, while Premier Edward Gawler Prior sat in the House of Commons as a Conservative. There was also a clear grouping of members who would often sit in opposition to, or in the cabinet of, certain other premiers. De Cosmos and his unofficial Liberals mutually supported each other (i.e. were in each other's cabinets). These premiers included McCreight, Walkem, Bevean, Semlin, and Martin. Meanwhile, Premiers Prior, Dunsmuir, Turner, A.E.B. Davie, Robson, Theodore Davie, Smithe, and Elliot sat in each other's cabinets or otherwise supported one another; while premiers from one group often sat in opposition to premiers from the other.

Since 1903

"Other" encompasses Independent seats and parties that never won more than one seat in an election.

See also
 List of premiers of British Columbia
 List of political parties in British Columbia
 List of British Columbia by-elections
 Timeline of Canadian elections

References

Bibliography
 
 
 
 

 
British Columbia general elections
Elections, General